is a Japanese badminton player from the Yonex team, who competed at the 2014 Asian Games. She educated physical education at the Nippon Sport Science University, Tokyo. Her older brother, Yusuke Naito is a badminton coach. Naito and her women's doubles partner Shizuka Matsuo have reached the career high as world number 3 in the BWF World ranking.

Achievements

Asian Championships 
Women's doubles

BWF Superseries 
The BWF Superseries, which was launched on 14 December 2006 and implemented in 2007, is a series of elite badminton tournaments, sanctioned by the Badminton World Federation (BWF). BWF Superseries levels are Superseries and Superseries Premier. A season of Superseries consists of twelve tournaments around the world that have been introduced since 2011. Successful players are invited to the Superseries Finals, which are held at the end of each year.

Women's doubles

  BWF Superseries Finals tournament
  BWF Superseries Premier tournament
  BWF Superseries tournament

BWF Grand Prix 
The BWF Grand Prix had two levels, the BWF Grand Prix and Grand Prix Gold. It was a series of badminton tournaments sanctioned by the Badminton World Federation (BWF) which was held from 2007 to 2017.

Women's doubles

  BWF Grand Prix Gold tournament
  BWF Grand Prix tournament

BWF International Challenge/Series 
Women's doubles

  BWF International Challenge tournament
  BWF International Series tournament

Record against selected opponents 
Record against year-end Finals finalists, World Championships semi-finalists, and Olympic quarter-finalists.

Shizuka Matsuo 

  Leanne Choo / Renuga Veeran 1–0
 /  Petya Nedelcheva / Anastasia Russkikh  2–1
   Alex Bruce / Michelle Li  1–0
   Cheng Shu / Zhao Yunlei  0–1
   Du Jing / Yu Yang  0–2
   Pan Pan / Zhang Yawen   0–1
   Tian Qing / Zhao Yunlei   1–7
   Wang Xiaoli / Yu Yang  0–7
   Xia Huan / Tang Jinhua  0–1
   Bao Yixin / Zhong Qianxin  0–5
   Bao Yixin / Tang Jinhua  0–1
   Luo Ying / Luo Yu  2–2
   Cheng Wen-hsing / Chien Yu-chin  2–3
   Christinna Pedersen / Kamilla Rytter Juhl  2–2
   Poon Lok Yan / Tse Ying Suet  3–2
   Jwala Gutta / Ashwini Ponnappa  2–0
   Nitya Krishinda Maheswari / Greysia Polii  0–6
   Vita Marissa / Nadya Melati  1–0
   Mizuki Fujii / Reika Kakiiwa  3–4
   Miyuki Maeda / Satoko Suetsuna  1–2
   Misaki Matsutomo / Ayaka Takahashi  3–2
   Reika Kakiiwa / Miyuki Maeda  1–0
   Ha Jung-eun / Kim Min-jung  0–6
   Jung Kyung-eun / Kim Ha-na  2–3
   Chin Eei Hui / Wong Pei Tty  1–0
   Valeria Sorokina / Nina Vislova  2–1
   Shinta Mulia Sari / Yao Lei  1–0
   Duanganong Aroonkesorn  / Kunchala Voravichitchaikul  4–0

References

External links 
 

1986 births
Living people
Sportspeople from Kanagawa Prefecture
Japanese female badminton players
Badminton players at the 2014 Asian Games
Asian Games bronze medalists for Japan
Asian Games medalists in badminton
Medalists at the 2014 Asian Games
21st-century Japanese women